Charly Bérard (born 27 September 1955) is a French former professional racing cyclist. He rode in seven editions of the Tour de France and one edition of the Giro d'Italia.

Major results

1980
8th Overall Tour Méditerranéen
1985
1st Stage 3 Tour de Suisse
2nd Overall Critérium International
1st Stage 2
 2nd Road race, National Road Championships
1986
4th Overall 4 Jours de Dunkerque
6th Overall Tour Méditerranéen
10th Overall Critérium du Dauphiné Libéré
1987
1st Chanteloup-les-Vignes
8th Overall Critérium International
10th Overall Route du Sud

References

External links
 

Living people
1955 births
French male cyclists
Cyclists from Nice